National Route 293 is a national highway of Japan connecting Hitachi, Ibaraki and Ashikaga, Tochigi in Japan, with a total length of 164.2 km (102.03 mi). It begins as an intersection with Japan National Route 245 in Hitachi, and runs inland through Hitachiōta, Hitachiōmiya, Bato, Ogawa, Ujiie, Utsunomiya, and Kanuma, finally reaching Ashikaga.

References

National highways in Japan
Roads in Ibaraki Prefecture
Roads in Tochigi Prefecture